Sidhartha is a 1998 Indian Malayalam film,  directed by  Jomon and produced by Madhavan Nair. Story, Screenplay & Dialogues done by Sathyanath. The film stars Mammootty, Jagadish, Rambha, Nedumudi Venu and Thilakan in lead roles. The film had musical score by Vidyasagar.

Cast
Mammootty as Sidharthan main protagonist, Karunakara and Lakshmi's son, Sreedevi stepson, Sethu stepbrother 
Rambha as Hema a medical student, commissioner sister / Siddhartha's love interest 
Thilakan as Raghavan Nair, Karunakara Menon brother-in-law / Balu and Radhika's father 
Jagadish as Pavithran Sidharthan's assistant and brother-like friend. 
Biju Menon as Sethu (Sidharthan's step-brother)
Nedumudi Venu as Karunakara Menon, Kozhikode mayor, father of Sidhartha and Sethu / 
Anju Aravind as Radhika (Raghavan's daughter)
Lalu Alex as Commissioner Harishankar, Hema's brother 
Shiju as Balu (Raghavan's son)
Srividya as Sridevi (Sidharthan's stepmother, Raghavan's sister)
Mini Nair as Commissioner's wife
Ponnamma Babu as Lakshmi, Sidharthan's mother / Karunakaran's wife.

Soundtrack
"Poomanathe Kannippadam" - K. J. Yesudas
"Alliyambalay" - K. S. Chithra, M. G. Sreekumar
"Kaivanna Thankamalle (Male)" - Jayachandran
"Mayikayamam" - K. S. Chithra, Hariharan
"Kaivanna Thankamalle (Female)" - K. S. Chithra

References

External links
 

1998 films
1990s Malayalam-language films
Films shot in Kozhikode
Films scored by Vidyasagar